Ashwin Das (born 16 December 1995) is an Indian cricketer. He made his first-class debut for Madhya Pradesh in the 2016–17 Ranji Trophy on 27 October 2016.

References

External links
 

1995 births
Living people
Indian cricketers
Madhya Pradesh cricketers
Cricketers from Bhopal